Yuhe Subdistrict is a subdistrict and the seat of Qidong County in Hunan, China. It was one of four subdistricts approved to establish in 2014. The subdistrict of Yuhe has 7 villages and 7 communities under its jurisdiction, its seat is at Yongchang Avenue.

History
The subdistrict of Yuhe was approved to establish from 17 villages and 7　communities of the former Hongqiao Town　in September 2014, it was officially created in November 2014 and named after the Yuhe mountain.

Subdivisions
The subdistrict of Yuhe had 17 villages and 7 communities at its establishment in 2014. Its villages were reduced to 7 from 17 through the amalgamation of villages in 2016, it has 7 villages and 7 communities under its jurisdiction.

7 villages
 Dafu Village: organized through merging 2 villages of Dazhu (大竹) and Fuguang (福广) in 2016
 Hejia Village: organized through merging 2 villages of Hejia (何家) and Pangu (盘古) in 2016
 Jiulong Village: organized through merging 3 villages of Zhangjia (张家), Li'etang (黎阿塘) and Qiaoting (乔亭) in 2016
 Luye Village: organized through merging 4 villages of Luye (绿野), Xinzhou (新洲), Fengxing (凤形) and Baihua (百花)　in 2016
 Qiaofeng Village: organized through merging 2 villages of Qiaomu (乔木) and Shifeng (石峰) in 2016
 Qingshan Village: organized through merging 2 villages of Qingshan (青山) and Shuiping (水平) in 2016
 Shanqiao Village: organized through merging 2 villages of Nuanshan (峦山) and Qiaodong (桥洞) in 2016

7 communities
 Caoxi Community
 Hongfeng Community
 Qifeng Community
 Sansheng Community
 Shimen Community
 Xinfeng Community
 Yanjia Community

References

Qidong County
Subdistricts of Hunan
County seats in Hunan